Tony David Clay (born 8 August 1991) is an English actor. He is best known for portraying the role of Callum "Halfway" Highway in the BBC soap opera EastEnders since 2018.

Early and personal life
Clay was born in Bexley, Kent on 8 August 1991 to Christopher and Suzanne Clay. He attended the Arts Educational Schools, London and graduated with a BA in acting in 2013.

Clay has been in a relationship with Olivia Griffin since August 2016.

Career
Clay's first role was in a short film called An Ordinary Life in 2012. In 2017, he played the role of Woody Gilbert in the show Stan Lee's Lucky Man. He has also appeared in Foyle's War and several theatre productions.

In January 2018, Clay joined the cast of EastEnders as Callum "Halfway" Highway and is introduced as a friend of the Carter family. During his initial stint on the show, the character is decipted as a "happy-go-lucky" character who wears shabby clothing and beanie hats. Originally contracted for two months, Clay reprised the role in April 2018 and since then the character's storylines have included a relationship with Whitney Dean (Shona McGarty), the introduction of the Halfway's brother Stuart Highway (Ricky Champ) and the character coming out as gay and beginning a relationship with Ben Mitchell (Max Bowden). Ben and Callum were married in May 2021.

Filmography

Television and film

Stage

Theatre

Awards and nominations

References

External links

1991 births
21st-century English male actors
Living people
English male soap opera actors